The New Guinean mouse bandicoots (genus Microperoryctes) or striped bandicoots are members of the order Peramelemorphia. In addition to the named species, there are two currently undescribed members of this genus.

Species 
 Mouse bandicoot (Microperoryctes murina)
 Arfak pygmy bandicoot (Microperoryctes aplini)
 Papuan bandicoot (Microperoryctes papuensis)
 Striped bandicoot (Microperoryctes longicauda) 
 Eastern striped bandicoot (Microperoryctes ornata)

References

Peramelemorphs
Marsupials of New Guinea
Mammals of Papua New Guinea
Mammals of Western New Guinea